The Regis School of the Sacred Heart is an elementary and middle school for boys located at 7330 Westview Drive in the Spring Branch area of Houston, in the U.S. state of Texas. The all boys school serves students in pre-kindergarten through eighth grade. The school has been single gender and non-profit since its founding and is a Houston Area Independent School. Regis is also part of the Roman Catholic Archdiocese of Galveston-Houston. As of 2022, the school has about 277 students enrolled, and it celebrated its thirtieth anniversary during the 2021–22 school year. Regis, an independent Catholic school, is the only all-boys school of the Archdiocese to have early childhood, elementary, and middle school programs in one school. Regis is the brother school of the Duchesne Academy of the Sacred Heart.

History
The school is located here. In 1990, a group of Duchesne families founded The Regis School with the goal of being accepted into the Network of Sacred Heart Schools. The school was scheduled to open in August 1991. In August, 1991, the school opened with 38 students in facilities leased from Holy Cross Lutheran Church. Since these temporary facilities were inadequate, a search was started for a more permanent solution. The current Milestones and Administration building was purchased and renovated, and classes began there in August 1992. The school was searching for a permanent site within  of Duchesne.

Between the school's first year of operation and its second year of operation, the student body increased by 83%. In January 1993 the school had 60 students in grades preschool through six. It planned to expand to the eighth grade and increase its student body to 320. Ninfa Laurenzo, the founder of the Ninfa's restaurant chain and a grandmother of a student at Regis, was honored at the annual "The Regis Merci" celebration on Wednesday April 13, 1994. The celebration honors individuals who were instrumental to the school's operations. Houston Mayor Bob Lanier declared that day "Ninfa Laurenzo Day" and presented this proclamation to her at the celebration.

In 1995, The Regis School earned accreditation from the Texas Catholic Conference Educational Department. In April of the same year, The Network of Sacred Heart Schools accepted The Regis School as a provisional member. Full membership was granted in 1998.

Over the years, growth of the school necessitated the installation of three temporary classroom buildings to house the upper grades. Through a capital campaign, the purchase of adjoining properties paved the way for expansion. In 2001, construction began on a new schooling building and several additional improvements, including a regulation sports field. In 2002, lower and middle school classes began the school year in the new building.

In 2005, Anne Storey Carty, the founding headmistress, announced that she would be retiring after the 2006 school year, the 15th anniversary of the school's founding. After a thorough search, Dr. Nancy Taylor was selected as the second headmistress of the school.

On November 8, 2007, Pulitzer Prize-winning humorist Dave Barry and New York Times bestseller Ridley Pearson visited the school in the afternoon.

In late 2010, construction began for a new student center with the demolition of the former pavilion.
On November 22, 2011, Regis honored veterans at its annual Veteran's Day celebration, with the students displaying posters on the school gates.
On January 30, 2012, the school held its first ever career day, where students had the opportunity to hear about a variety of jobs from professional workers.
The school held its first large event in the new Student Life Center in a liturgy celebrating Grandparent's Day on October 19, 2012.
Regis officially opened the Student Life Center for daily use on November 6, 2012, with its liturgy for the dedication of the new building.

Accreditation
Regis was the first school voted into membership in the National Network of Sacred Heart Schools in 1998. Through its reflective process concerning how its community lives the Goals and Criteria, Regis received its SHCOG renewal site visit in March 2009. Regis is also accredited by the Texas Catholic Conference Educational Department, under the auspices of the Texas Education Agency. The Independent Schools Association of the Southwest invited Regis to membership as its 86th accredited school in June 2010.

Goals and criteria
The Goals and Criteria are the conditions for every school that belongs to the Sacred Heart Network. In the late 1960s and in the aftermath of the Second Vatican Council, Sacred Heart schools faced a number of serious challenges. A declining number of religious workers available for work in the schools, a diminishing number of Sacred Heart schools open and operating, and the development of independent Boards of Trustees in the remaining establishments were some of these. Sacred Heart educators began to meet to find a way to secure the legacy and vision of a Sacred Heart education in the United States. Eventually, five goals true to the inspiration of St. Madeleine Sophie Barat were published that helped to define what a Sacred Heart school strives to do. Specific criteria were drawn up for judging whether an institution was indeed following the five goals and  deserved membership in the Network of Sacred Heart Schools. The original Goals and Criteria published in 1975 were adapted and redefined in 2005 to reflect more accurately the challenges facing the schools. The school has five foundational principles on what a Sacred Heart school should be. The Regis School teaches according to these goals and criteria:

Goal 1: Educate to a personal and active faith in God.

Goal 2: Educate to a deep respect for intellectual values.

Goal 3: Educate to a social awareness which impels to action.

Goal 4: Educate to the building of community as a Christian value.

Goal 5: Educate to personal growth in an atmosphere of wise freedom.

Philosophy
The Regis School is an independent Catholic School where boys become scholars and gentlemen in the 
Sacred Heart tradition. Regis commits itself to educate to:
a personal and active faith in God,
a deep respect for intellectual values,
a social awareness which impels to action,
the building of community as a Christian value and
personal growth in an atmosphere of wise freedom.

Divisions
The Regis School is divided into three divisions by grade level: Early Childhood, Lower School, and Middle School for grades Pre-K through 8th grade.

Early Childhood
 Grades: 3 Pre-K through 4 Pre-K
 Schedule: 8:00 am to 11:30 am (3 Pre-K half-day) / 8:00 am to 3:00 pm (3 Pre-K through 4 Pre-K)
 Curriculum: Age appropriate Language Arts, Mathematics, Social Sciences, Fine Arts, and Motor Skills

The Early Childhood playing is started with learning about their unique talents and how they can affect the world positively.  Developmental and readiness goals are established for each of the following broad areas: Religion, Language Arts, mathematics, science, social studies, fine arts, computer technology and physical education. Every student learns to use his unique talents for personal growth and to help to live cooperatively with others. The school tries to understand and recognize each student learns at his own pace.

The curriculum of Early Childhood is strong and challenging. The framework of Sacred Heart Schools: faith, academics, service, community building and the making of wise decisions is incorporated in all sectors. To ensure each student's success, Regis provides communication with parents. Self-discipline is taught through modeling, positive reinforcement and redirection. Regis believes in children and strives to work to reach each student's potential. There is an atmosphere of family and nurturing which is felt and an indelible acceptance of serenity and peace when one walks through the door.

Lower School
 Grades: K through 4th
 Schedule: 8:00 am to 3:15 pm
 Curriculum
Core Subjects: Religion, Language Arts, Mathematics, Science, and Social Studies
Ancillary Subjects: Art, Drama, Music, Computer Literacy, Spanish, and Physical Education

The Lower School embraces knowledge, adapting the teaching styles to encourage learning. They consider hands-on activities as an important element of the boys' learning, and their classes involve active learning throughout the day. Classroom size continues to be a small number of about 12 students per class. The use of technology throughout the school extends lessons even further as they interact with Smartboards and computers.

The firm foundation of skills developed in lower school are to help boys develop independence, confidence, and competency. The core curriculum is based on Religion, Language Arts, Mathematics, Science and Social Studies. In addition, Regis offers Art, Music, Computer Literacy, Spanish and Physical Education. In all course areas, students are encouraged to think, share, reason, predict and apply their knowledge to scenarios. Field trips are also done in the Lower School area.

Middle school
 Grades: 5th through 8th
 Schedule: 8:00 am to 3:30 pm
 Curriculum: Religion, English, Math, Social Studies, Science, Physical Education, Computer, Art, Modern Language, Foreign Language: (Spanish, or French)
 Class Trips
5th and 6th grades:  Camp Allen (2 days)
7th grade: Texas History - Austin, Washington-on-the-Brazos, and San Antonio (2 days)
8th grade: American History - Washington, D.C. (4 Days)

The Middle School offers students a rich core curriculum integrating active and experiential learning. Close attention is given to reading, writing, and study skills. The curriculum is designed to engage and challenge the intellect, imagination, and energy of talented students. The middle school experience is focused on energy that supports the development of the individual student. Boys profit from the skill of the faculty and receive the individual attention that they deserve. Regis creates an environment which is conducive to learning.

Students become well-versed in using technology to help them explore the information within their course of study and produce multimedia presentations for projects. Technology is fully integrated into the entire curriculum. At the sixth grade level, boys are given laptops. Smartboards are also located in each classroom, enabling the teachers to extend their teaching possibilities.

Student Council
A President, Vice President, Secretary, Treasurer, Social Awareness Ambassador, and historian are elected by the student body during the late spring of the school year, who serve as the main leaders for the Student Council in the following year. The Student Council also consists of class representatives of the middle school's classes, and at-large members, or unelected members. The Student Council meets every week to discuss problems, organize events, and give a voice to the students. (Winning info will not be published to protect identities.)

Laptop program
In the 2010–11 school year, middle school students began to receive MacBook Pro laptops. Middle school students, beginning in the sixth grade, are given a school-specified laptop computer. In class, students use the computers in various ways to assist in their learning.

Campus

The school is located on a  site that it purchased in May 1992 for $1.3 million. This site is in the Spring Branch district, in the immediate area of the Afton Village subdivision.

In September 2011 the school held a groundbreaking ceremony for the Student Life Center, a  multi-purpose building on the west side of the school campus. Bishop Vincent M. Rizzotto also attended the ceremony to bless the construction site. The building opened in the autumn of 2012. The school enacted the "Building a Legacy" capital campaign in order to raise $6 million to construct the building. The building houses a gymnasium, weight room, indoor cafeteria, additional instructional classrooms, assembly area for drama and music productions, the Celebration of the Liturgy, and special events.

Student life

Academics
The academics is based on the same core subjects throughout a student's tenure at Regis. This is more strongly influenced with specific educational programs that are used through textbooks. Specific programs provide a strong base of knowledge for Regis students. Many teachers also try to provide their own form of a structured and well-managed curriculum for their own subject. As of 1993 all students are required to take Catholic religion classes and attend Catholic religious services. Non-Catholic students take the classes as a form of academic education. In late January 2012, Regis students were also highly recognized at the St. Pius Academic Rally. The participating students won four gold medals, four silver medals, two bronze medals, and four Honorable Mentions.
In 2013, Regis once again participated in the Academic Rally, this time winning five gold, five silver, three bronze medals, and nine honorable mentions.
Regis students also participated in the Strake Prep Bowl in January 2013, where they placed third in the competition. In 2017, the Regis Math Club team participated in the St. Agnes Math Competition, winning the competition for the third time in a row.

Athletics

Kindergarten and lower school athletics are organized and coached by parent volunteers. The boys play soccer in the fall, basketball in the winter, and baseball in the spring.

Middle school athletics are organized and coached by Gary Holub, the school's athletic director. Through tryouts, boys may be selected to junior varsity and varsity teams. Middle school students also play soccer and basketball, but substitute rugby for baseball.
Additional fees, for referees, uniforms, and league fees are required for each team a student joins. The Knights play in the Southwest conference of the Greater Houston Catholic Sports Association.  The Regis Varsity Basketball Team won the 2008 Greater Houston Catholic Athletic Association by defeating the St. Laurence Saints at Strake Jesuit’s gymnasium with a score of 70-68.
In the 2011 season, the Regis Knights placed third in soccer in the GHCAA tournament. In January 2012, the Regis Knights Varsity basketball team also placed third in its respective tournament by defeating St. Elizabeth Ann Seton. Later that season, the Varsity team won third place overall in the GHCAA playoffs with a victory over Sacred Heart Conroe.

In the 2012-13 school year, the Regis soccer team played in the championship game, where they were defeated by John Paul II, claiming Second Place.

The Regis Basketball team started off the season winning First Place in the annual St. Thomas High School tournament, defeating Trafton by one point.

In the 2016-2017 Soccer season the Knights beat St. Martha Catholic school in the championship final. They won 1-0.

Service projects
Nancy Taylor, an ex-headmistress of the school, said in 2010 that the school aimed to instill the value of helping others in its students. The school uses several extracurricular projects, such as a "Big Brother, Little Brother" program and a "Social Justice" program. Jennifer Glover, the school's director of admission, said in 2008 that "The social justice program is essentially a program being built around rule number three, social awareness which impels to action. Essentially what the school is trying to do is to take that issue the communities confront and educate the boys on those issues and also built some initiative or activity around that particular issue so that the boys can really get a feel of how it is impacting the community." In 2008 Sacred Heart established a donation program for the Houston Food Bank. The school also participates in the Operation Rice Bowl campaign, where boys only eat a bowl of white rice for one day during Ash Wednesday.
Every Christmas, Regis students also give out shoeboxes filled with toiletries to local charities.

Extended day
Regis offers Kidventure as an organized after school option for the convenience of parents and the benefits of students. Morning extended day is available from 7:00 am to 7:30 am for an additional fee. After-school extended day is available from dismissal to 6:00 pm. The purpose of the After School Camp is to provide a program geared towards the continued development and growth of each boy in the areas of academics, sports, and fine arts. In addition, the program seeks to enhance and further a student's social,
emotional, physical, and creative abilities. As a separate, but complementary program to school, the purpose of the Extended Day Program is to enrich the life of each young boy through the guidance and instruction of the Kidventure staff. Students also engage in a variety of activities such as athletics, homework, and games.

School uniforms
Daily school uniforms are mandatory and dress uniforms are required to be worn on certain occasions. These events include school masses, assemblies, and other important events. Other than on these days, a regular school uniform is worn. Uniforms are available through Sue Mills Uniform Company. Students are expected to be well-groomed and dressed in complete presentable uniforms at all times.

Board of trustees
The 19-member Board of Trustees consists of the head of the school, parents of current and former students, Sacred Heart nuns, and other religious leaders. The Members of the Regis Board of Trustees as of 2016-2017 included: Mr. Brett Agee, Mr. Tristan Berlanga, Mrs. Anita Bryant Sr. Anne Byrne (RSCJ), Mrs. Maricarmen Cano, Mr. John Cogan, Mrs. Julie Davis, Mr. Erik Dybesland Sr. Sharon Karam (RSCJ), Mrs. Wanda Kielty, Mrs. Megan Long, Mr. Sean Muller, Fr. Jim Murphy (CSB), Mr. Trip Norkus, Mr. Matthew Schicke, Mrs. Lauren Summerville, Mr. Ivan Villarreal, Mr. Charles Wilson, and Mr. Dennis Phillips, ex-officio.

Tuition

In 1993, the annual tuition was $3,000 ($ when adjusted for inflation) for half day preschool, $4,800 ($ when adjusted for inflation) for students in grades Kindergarten through fourth, and $5,000 ($ when adjusted for inflation) for fifth graders. Because, unlike parochial schools, Regis is not directly associated with the archdiocese, the archdiocese does not give a subsidy to the school. Anne Storey Carty, the headmistress, said during that year that, as paraphrased by Richard Vara of the Houston Chronicle, "the education is not cheap". The school, as of 1993, offers tuition assistance for families who qualify. Carty said, "We are not out to make this a school for the upper classes." The current tuition for the 2013–14 school year ranges through $20,000.

After Regis
Once students have completed their studies at Regis, boys go on to study at a large variety of schools around the country. The high schools that these boys go to include the Awty International School. Brewster Academy, Culver Military Academy, Episcopal School, Kinkaid School, Houston Christian High School, Memorial High School, Second Baptist School, St. John's School, St. Pius X School, St. Stephen's Episcopal School, St. Thomas High School, Strake Jesuit College Preparatory, High School for the Visual and Performing Arts, The Tenney School, and Westchester International School.

See also

 Duchesne Academy of the Sacred Heart - Sister school
 Christianity in Houston

References

External links
 The Regis School of the Sacred Heart - Official website
 Network of Sacred Heart Schools - Sacred Heart Schools in the United States
 Catholic Community Forum - St. John Francis Regis biography

Catholic elementary schools in Houston
Independent Schools Association of the Southwest
Educational institutions established in 1990
Schools in Harris County, Texas
Private K–8 schools in Houston
Sacred Heart schools in the United States
Catholic K–8 schools in the United States
Boys' schools in Texas
Spring Branch, Houston
1990 establishments in Texas